Notable spaceflight activities in 2017 included the maiden flight of India's Geosynchronous Satellite Launch Vehicle Mark III (also called LVM3) on 5 June and the first suborbital test of Rocket Lab's Electron rocket, inaugurating the Mahia spaceport in New Zealand. The rocket is named for its innovative Rutherford engine which feeds propellants via battery-powered electric motors instead of the usual gas generator and turbopumps.

Overview
China launched its new missile-derived Kaituozhe-2 variant on 2 March. The Japanese SS-520, a suborbital sounding rocket modified for orbital flight, failed to reach orbit in January. If successful, it would have become the smallest and lightest vehicle to ever put an object in orbit.

The venerable Russian Soyuz-U workhorse was retired after its 786th mission on 22 February. On 30 March, the SES-10 mission was launched with a previously flown Falcon 9 first stage, achieving a key milestone in the SpaceX reusable launch system development program; several other Falcon 9 first-stage boosters were re-used since then.

After a record-breaking 13-year mission observing Saturn, its rings and moons, the Cassini space probe was deliberately destroyed by plunging into Saturn's atmosphere, on 15 September 2017.

A record number of 466 satellites were attempted to be launched thanks to an increase in the number of small satellites. 289 of all satellites weighted less than 10 kg. The number of small satellites launched exceeded even the most optimistic forecasts.

Orbital launches 

|colspan=8 style="background:white;"|

January 
|-

|colspan=8 style="background:white;"|

February 
|-

|colspan=8 style="background:white;"|

March 
|-

|colspan=8 style="background:white;"|

April 
|-

|colspan=8 style="background:white;"|

May 
|-

|colspan=8 style="background:white;"|

June 
|-

|colspan=8 style="background:white;"|

July 
|-

|colspan=8 style="background:white;"|

August 
|-

|colspan=8 style="background:white;"|

September 
|-

|colspan=8 style="background:white;"|

October 
|-

|colspan=8 style="background:white;"|

November 
|-

|colspan=8 style="background:white;"|

December 
|-

|colspan=8 style="background:white;"| 

|}

Suborbital flights 

|}

Deep-space rendezvous

Extravehicular activities (EVAs)

Orbital launch statistics

By country 
For the purposes of this section, the yearly tally of orbital launches by country assigns each flight to the country of origin of the rocket, not to the launch services provider or the spaceport. For example, Soyuz launches by Arianespace in Kourou are counted under Russia because Soyuz-2 is a Russian rocket.

By rocket

By family

By type

By configuration

By spaceport

By orbit

References 
Notes

Citations

External links 

 
Spaceflight by year
2017-related lists